Corona–North Main is a station on Metrolink's Inland Empire–Orange County and 91/Perris Valley Lines located in Corona, California. The station is located at 250 East Blaine Street, near North Main Street (after which the station is named), and is the second busiest station in the entire Metrolink system. Corona–North Main station consists of two side platforms serving two tracks. A parking lot with 500 spaces is available for passengers.

The station is located near the former Santa Fe Railway depot, now used as a restaurant and bar.

Hours and frequency

Connections 
The Corona Transit Center located at the station offers connections to Riverside Transit Agency and the City of Corona's Corona Cruiser buses, all of which are free with a valid Metrolink ticket or pass.

 the following connections are available:
Corona Cruiser: Blue, Red
Riverside Transit Agency: 1, 3, 206

References

External links 

Metrolink stations in Riverside County, California
Transportation in Corona, California
Buildings and structures in Corona, California
Railway stations in the United States opened in 2002